Supercluster is a recording project that formed during 2007 in Athens, Georgia. It includes musicians from the Athens, Georgia bands New Sound Of Numbers, Bob Hay & the Jolly Beggars, Casper & the Cookies, Of Montreal, Circulatory System and Pylon, along with Elephant 6 recording artist John Fernandes.  Members presently include Hannah M. Jones, Bob Hay, Bill David, Kay Stanton, Bryan Poole, Vanessa Briscoe Hay, Jason NeSmith and John Fernandes. Alumni include Randy Bewley (deceased), Heather McIntosh, Will Cullen Hart and Peter Erchick. Supercluster play what they term "Appalachian Wave."  For a brief period they were known as  FFFM.

On February 23, 2009, Randy Bewley was driving on Barber Street in Athens when he suffered a heart attack. According to the band Pylon's statement, his van drifted off the road and overturned.  He was admitted to Athens Regional Medical Center and lapsed into a coma; he died two days later on February 25 when he was removed from life support.

Bradford Cox from the group Deerhunter came into Bel*Air studio and helped Supercluster finish the last couple of tracks that needed to be recorded for Waves which was released October 6, 2009 on Cloud Recordings Live performance guitar duties are now handled by Jason NeSmith and Bryan Poole.
Supercluster have continued to record singles since this release and perform locally in Athens, Georgia. They plan on releasing a full length project at some point composed of these singles.

Discography

Singles
"I Got The Answer/Sunflower Clock" 7 inch limited edition single (2009),Cloud Recordings/ Studio Mouse Productions
"Paris Effect/Neat in the Street" 7 inch limited edition single (2011), Cloud Recordings/Studio Mouse Productions
"Things We Used To Drink/Memory Of The Future" 7 inch limited edition single (2012),Studio Mouse Productions

Albums and EPs
Special 5 e.p. (2007)
Waves CD (2009), Cloud Recordings/Studio Mouse Productions

Video
 Too Many Eights (2007), Supercluster, from CDR EP: Special 5
 I Got the Answer (2009), Supercluster, from: CD Waves, Studio Mouse Productions/Cloud Recordings
 Neat In The Street (2011), Supercluster, from: single Paris Effect/Neat In The Street, Studio Mouse Productions/Cloud Recordings. Written by The Side Effects (Butchart/Ellison/Swartz), 1980.
 Memory Of The Future (2012), Supercluster, from: single Things We Used To Drink/Memory Of The Future, Studio Mouse Productions. Directed by Hana Hay and Hannah Jones from artwork by Hannah Jones.

Notes

External links
 Supercluster MySpace web page
 Cloud Recordings web site
 Pylon official web site
 [ AllMusic entry on Pylon]
 [ AllMusic entry on The New Sound of Numbers]
 [ AllMusic entry on The Squalls]
 [  AllMusic entry on Casper and the Cookies]
 Athens Banner-Herald article Groups Mix Musicians from 80's & 90's
 Review of Athens Popfest performance
 Creative Loafing Interview with Vanessa Hay about the origins of the Athens, GA music scene and Supercluster
 Blurt Magazine interview with Supercluter Athens Alternate Alternative

The Elephant 6 Recording Company artists
Musical groups from Athens, Georgia
Rock music groups from Georgia (U.S. state)